Niutuo  is a town situated in Gu'an County, Langfang, Hebei, China. The town administers 50 village-level divisions.

See also
List of township-level divisions of Hebei

References

Township-level divisions of Hebei
Gu'an County